Ludwik Konstanty Pociej (1664-1730) was a Polish nobleman, podkomorzy of Brest, podskarbi, castelan and voivode of Vilnius,  Great and Field Hetman of Lithuania.

References 
 Kawalerowie i statuty Orderu Orła Białego 1705-2008, 2008, p. 140.

External links
https://www.wilanow-palac.pl/ludwik_konstanty_pociej_1664_1730_ludzki_placz.html

1664 births
1730 deaths
17th-century Lithuanian nobility
18th-century Lithuanian nobility
17th-century Polish nobility
18th-century Polish nobility
Field Hetmans of the Grand Duchy of Lithuania
Grand Treasurers of the Grand Duchy of Lithuania
Great Hetmans of the Grand Duchy of Lithuania
Ludwik
Recipients of the Order of the White Eagle (Poland)
Secular senators of the Polish–Lithuanian Commonwealth
Voivode of Vilnius